Jump Station is an unincorporated community in Floyd County, Kentucky.

History
A post office called Jump was established in 1927, and remained in operation until 1953. The community has the name of one Mr. Jump, a businessperson in the local mining industry.

References

Unincorporated communities in Floyd County, Kentucky
Unincorporated communities in Kentucky